Craik is a hamlet in Craik Forest, by the Airhouse Burn in the Scottish Borders area of Scotland, close to Roberton, Scottish Borders.

The area is renowned for its red squirrel population, and for its Roman history.

Etymology

Craik seems in origin straightforwardly to be the Cumbric word *creic 'rock'.

See also 
List of places in the Scottish Borders
List of places in Scotland

References

External links
Old Roads of Scotland: Craik
Craik: trails for cyclists, walkers and horse riders
Forestry commission: Craik and Craik Forest
Borders Disability Forum: Craik Forest
The Southern Reporter, February 2006: Bitter battle of Craik ends

Villages in the Scottish Borders